Abdullah Al-Bladi (born October 14, 1993) is a Saudi football player who plays a forward for Al-Sharq.

References

External links 
 

1993 births
Living people
Saudi Arabian footballers
People from Al-Hasa
Association football forwards
Al-Fateh SC players
Al-Nojoom FC players
Al-Washm Club players
Al-Thoqbah Club players
Al-Nahda Club (Saudi Arabia) players
Al Omran Club players
Al-Sharq Club players
Saudi Professional League players
Saudi First Division League players
Saudi Third Division players
Saudi Second Division players
Saudi Arabian Shia Muslims